The Mood is the fifth mini album by South Korean rock band F.T. Island. It was released in South Korea on November 18, 2013, by FNC Music and distributed by Mnet Media. It features the song "Madly", a rock ballad. Members Choi Jong-hoon, Lee Jae-jin, and Lee Hong-gi each composed a song for the album. The record placed first on Hanteo's weekly album chart, as well as on Gaon Chart. Preorders of the album lead the HMV online chart in Japan.

Track list

References 

 

2013 EPs
F.T. Island EPs
Korean-language EPs
FNC Entertainment EPs